"The Statue Got Me High" is a song by American alternative rock band They Might Be Giants. The song was released as the lead single from the band's 1992 album, Apollo 18. The song reached number 24 on the Billboard Alternative Songs chart. The B-sides "I'm Def" and "Which Describes How You're Feeling" are both taken from the band's 1985 demo tape, which was recorded using low-quality equipment.

Composition 
"The Statue Got Me High" was written by John Linnell. Of the meaning of the song's lyrics, Linnell said:
It's kind of a song about having an epiphany or something. The song actually started with completely different lyrics. That's what I was saying about dummy lyrics. I think the song was called 'The Apple of My Eye'. When I came up with the line 'the statue got me high', it amused me. It was taking two things and putting them together - not a non sequitur but something sort of interesting and odd about the juxtaposition of those two things. Part of it is that it's the idea that the statue would be in a public square, a monument. Not necessarily a work of art, but something that's just utterly immobile and represents something that's in the past - just the idea of that blowing somebody's mind. It seems like one of the least likely things to make the top of your head come off, and that's what happens in the song.

Since its release Linnell has compared the lyrics of the song to the Mozart opera Don Giovanni, which also features a deadly confrontation with a statue.

Somebody compared the song to the story of Don Giovanni which I was not familiar with. It was kind of wonderful that they came up with that. It made the song more interesting to me.

Promotion and packaging 
A music video was produced for the single, directed by Adam Bernstein. It premiered on MTV's 120 Minutes in February, 1992. The video features John Linnell and John Flansburgh among various space-themed sculptures and fully suited astronauts at the Sepulveda Dam. At certain points, the video depicts John Linnell's head over a red silhouette of flames. A second version of the video, which does not show the flames and instead shows stock footage of a heartbeat monitor, was also produced, because according to Flansburgh, flames are not allowed to be shown on British television.
 
Like Apollo 18, the single's art largely features photography from the NASA archives.

Track listing
US cassette / European CD
 "The Statue Got Me High" – 3:06
 "Which Describes How You're Feeling" (demo) – 1:24
 "I'm Def" – 1:08

European 12"
 "The Statue Got Me High" – 3:06
 "She's Actual Size (album version)" – 2:05
 "I'm Def" – 1:08
 "Which Describes How You're Feeling" (demo) – 1:24

European 7" 
 "The Statue Got Me High" – 3:06
 "She's Actual Size (album version)" – 2:05

Personnel 
They Might Be Giants
John Flansburgh
John Linnell

Additional musicians
Jim Thomas - drums on "She's Actual Size"

Production
They Might Be Giants - producers
Bill Krauss - producer for "I'm Def" and "Which Describes How You're Feeling All the Time"
Edward Douglas IV - engineer
Alan Winstanley - mixing
Paul Angelli - recording

Chart positions

References

External links
The Statue Got Me High EP on This Might Be A Wiki
"The Statue Got Me High" (song) on This Might Be A Wiki

1992 singles
1992 songs
They Might Be Giants songs
Elektra Records singles